Martina Navratilova was the defending champion but lost in the finals to top seed Monica Seles 3–6, 6–2, 6–1.

Seeds
A champion seed is indicated in bold text while text in italics indicates the round in which that seed was eliminated. The top four seeds received a bye to the second round.

  Monica Seles (champion)
  Martina Navratilova (final)
  Mary Joe Fernández (semifinals)
  Katerina Maleeva (semifinals)
  Zina Garrison-Jackson (quarterfinals)
  Amy Frazier (first round)
  Brenda Schultz (quarterfinals)
  Pam Shriver (quarterfinals)

Draw

Final

Section 1

Section 2

External links
 1993 Virginia Slims of Chicago Draw
 1993 Virginia Slims of Chicago Draw
 No Lights Out For Martina
 Slims Stage Set - Seles Vs. Navratilova
 Seles edges Martina in Chicago final

Ameritech Cup
1993 WTA Tour
1993 in American tennis
1993 in sports in Illinois